Abdias Treu (sometimes spelled Trew) (29 July 1597 – 12 April 1669) was a German mathematician and academic. He was the professor of mathematics and physical science at the University of Altdorf from 1636-1669. He is best known for his contributions to the field of astronomy. He also contributed writings on the mathematical nature of music theory. He is the grandfather of physician and botanist Christoph Jacob Treu.

References

1597 births
1669 deaths
17th-century German mathematicians